Browning is a village in Schuyler County, Illinois, United States. The population was 130 at the 2000 census.

Geography
Browning is located at  (40.129321, -90.372441).

Demographics

As of the census of 2000, there were 130 people, 57 households, and 38 families residing in the village. The racial makeup of the village was 99.23% White and 0.77% Native American. Hispanic or Latino of any race were 1.54% of the population. There were 57 households, out of which 19.3% had children under the age of 18 living with them, 57.9% were married couples living together, 7.0% had a female householder with no husband present, and 31.6% were non-families. 29.8% of all households were made up of individuals, and 21.1% had someone living alone who was 65 years of age or older. The average household size was 2.28 and the average family size was 2.79.

In the village, the population was spread out, with 16.2% under the age of 18, 10.0% from 18 to 24, 18.5% from 25 to 44, 27.7% from 45 to 64, and 27.7% who were 65 years of age or older. The median age was 47 years. For every 100 females, there were 91.2 males. For every 100 females age 18 and over, there were 87.9 males.

The median income for a household in the village was $44,107, and the median income for a family was $50,625. Males had a median income of $31,667 versus $21,667 for females. The per capita income for the village was $18,109. There were no families and 3.7% of the population living below the poverty line, including no under eighteens and 10.3% of those over 64.

References

Villages in Schuyler County, Illinois
Villages in Illinois